Completely is the second studio album of Filipino singer Christian Bautista, released on 15 December 2005 in the Philippines by Warner Music Philippines. Its singles include "Everything You Do", "Invincible", "She Could Be", and "My Heart Has a Mind of Its Own". Bautista wrote two songs for the album (a first time for the singer) —"Now That You Are Here" and "Please Don't Go". On January 30, 2006, he went to Indonesia to stage a concert, attend TV and radio guestings, and shoot music videos for "Since I Found You" and "For Everything I Am". In 2006, the album was certified Platinum by the Philippine Association of the Record Industry.

The album was released on digital download through iTunes and Amazon.com on January 16, 2007. American actor-singer Corbin Bleu covered the single "She Could Be" on his 2007 album, Another Side. To date, it has sold over 150,000 copies in Asia.

Critical reception 

Completely received positive reviews from critics. Resty Odon of Titik Pilipino gave the album four out of five stars, explaining, "This album starts off with the regular ballads [...] It then shifts to an experimentation with more upbeat tunes". He added "This album boasts of having employed international songwriters [...] Christian also proves he can write a song or two ("Now That You Are Here", "Please Don’t Go") – another plus point". He praised the last number, "Nais Ko", stressing out the new side of Bautista that he called "louder, bolder, zippy". However, he disliked the upbeat numbers, saying "I think Christian’s almost one-dimensional pitch should stick to the ballads".

Track listing 
All tracks were produced by Neil Gregorio.

Personnel 
Credits were taken from Titik Pilipino.

 Christian Bautista - lead vocals, back-up vocals
 Rey Cortez - album cover layout
 GR Diaz - styling
 Gian Espiritu - grooming
 Chris Genuino - album cover layout
 Neil Gregorio - album producer, A&R administration, mastering and sequencing
 Ricky R. Ilacad - executive producer, A&R administration
 Paolo Pineda - photography
 Angeloe Villegas - arranger (track 12)
 Mastered and sequenced at Chili Red Studio

Certifications

Release history

References 

2006 albums
Christian Bautista albums